Purchase Tax was a tax levied between 1940 and 1973 on the wholesale value of luxury goods sold in the United Kingdom. Introduced on 21 October 1940, with the stated aim of reducing the wastage of raw materials during World War II, it was initially set at a rate of 33.33%.

The tax was subsequently set at differing rates dependent upon individual items' degree of "luxury" as determined by the government of the day.

The 33.33% rate was increased to 66% for cars costing over £1000 in 1947 and this rate was extended to all cars from 1951. In 1953 it was reduced to 50%.

In connection with the accession of the UK to the European Economic Community Purchase Tax was abolished on 2 April 1973 and replaced by  Value Added Tax (VAT), initially set at a rate of 10%, which was shortly afterwards reduced to 8%.

References

History of taxation in the United Kingdom
Sales taxes